Dyche is a surname. Notable people with the surname include:

 Lewis Lindsay Dyche (1857–1915), American naturalist
 Max Dyche (born 2003), English footballer
 Mick Dyche (1951–2018), English guitarist
 Schubert R. Dyche (1893–1982), American football and basketball coach
 Sean Dyche (born 1971), English footballer and manager
 Thomas Dyche (died 1733), English lexicographer